Ilocos Norte National High School (formerly known as Ilocos Norte High School) is a public school located in Laoag City, Ilocos Norte

History 
Established in 1906 which housed Elementary grades, a second year class was created in 1909, followed by a third year class in 1910 and finally the complete high school course in 1916. Ten years after the establishment of the first year. 

The first permanent building called the Ilocos Norte Provincial High School, was completed in 1909 -- Two years after the Honorable Provincial Board appropriated necessary funds to cover the expenses incurred. This building is now part of Ilocos Norte College of Arts and Trades (or INCAT) as the Related-Subjects-Building. It was used to provide adequate facilities for an expanded school population, it was however destroyed in the summer of June, 1941 due to a fire. A new school building was erected in 1929 in an adjacent site where INNHS now stands. Due to the unexpected destruction of the Related-Subjects-Building, the students of the following year were forced to study in improvised classrooms in several rented houses and in the grandstands of the provincial Grounds (also known as Marcos Stadium)

During the Japanese occupation of the Philippines Girls and Boys were segregated into two separate buildings known as the Boy's High School and the Girl's High School, but after some time it was destroyed, the source of which is unknown. However, with the aid of the U.S.A under the Rehabilitation Act of 1946 the destroyed building was rehabilitated.

During its early years of its existence, the school was administered by America, the first of which was a man named Mr. George Summers who later married the former Ms. Julia Agcaoili  and the last American was Mr. Muilenberg. From thence on the position was held by Filipinos, Mr. Jose Aguila held the position from 1936 until 1937.

The first alumnus of the school to be had by his Alma Mater is a Mr. Fermin Montano.

A Mr. Arsenio  A. Pascua enjoy's the honor and distinction of being the last principal of Ilocos Norte High School and the first principal of Ilocos Norte National High School he also has the longest rendered service. Ten years exactly by July 1, 1967.

References

High schools in the Philippines
Educational institutions established in 1906
Schools in Laoag
1906 establishments in the Philippines